The Citadel Bulldogs baseball represents The Citadel, The Military College of South Carolina in college baseball at the NCAA Division I level.  The program was established in 1899, and has continuously fielded a team since 1947.  Their primary rivals are College of Charleston, Furman and VMI.

2010

Roster

Coaches

Schedule

2011

This season marked the first time The Citadel finished last in the SoCon and did not qualify for the Southern Conference baseball tournament.  This came on the heels of the 2010 regular season and tournament championship, and NCAA Regional appearance.  However, the season was marked by some early success, including a win over top–ranked South Carolina, which won national championships in both 2010 and 2011.

Roster

Coaches

Schedule

2011 MLB draft
Pitcher Matt Talley was drafted in the 28th Round, 866th overall, by the Atlanta Braves.

2012

The Bulldogs were picked by both the Southern Conference Media and Coaches to finish 8th in the 11 team Southern Conference.  3B Drew DeKerlegand was named to the first team preseason All-Conference Team, while OF Nick Orvin made the second team.  On Saturday April 14, Jordan claimed his 700th career victory in a 3–0 victory over UNC Greenbsoro.  The Bulldogs coach is the 36th active member of the 700 win club at the Division I level.

Roster

Coaches

Schedule

2013

Roster

Schedule

Honors and awards

SoCon Pitcher of the Year
Austin Pritcher

All-Conference First Team
Austin Pritcher (Media and Coaches)
Joe Jackson (Media and Coaches)

All-Conference Second Team
Hughston Armstrong (Media and Coaches)
Bo Thompson (Media and Coaches)
Skylar Hunter (Media and Coaches)
Mason Davis (Coaches)
Calvin Orth (Media)

SoCon All-Freshman Team
Skylar Hunter

SoCon Player of the Month
Tyler Griffin (February)

SoCon Pitcher of the Month
Austin Pritcher (February)
Austin Pritcher (April)

Collegiate Baseball Hitter of the Week
Tyler Griffin (February 18 – February 24)

SoCon Player of the Week
Drew DeKerlegand (March 4)
Bo Thompson (March 18)
Jonathan Stokes (April 29)

SoCon Pitcher of the Week
Austin Pritcher (April 29)
Austin Pritcher (May 13)

2014

Roster

Coaches

Schedule
Severe weather along the East Coast delayed  arrival in Charleston for the opening weekend tournament, and canceled many other games around the Southeast.  As a result, Virginia Tech was a late addition to the tournament field and played the opening game against the Bulldogs on February 14.

2015

Roster

Coaches

Schedule

2016

Roster
The Bulldogs suspended three starters, Drew Ellis, Austin Mapes, and Phillip Watcher, on March 30, 2016, for violations of team rules and dismissed them on April 6.  Phillip Watcher's twin brother Jacob remained on the team.

Coaches

Schedule

2017

Roster

Coaches

Schedule

2018

Personnel

Roster

Coaches

Schedule

2019

Personnel

Roster

Coaches

Schedule

References

The Citadel Bulldogs baseball seasons